Mandritsaria is a genus of beetles in the family Buprestidae, containing the following species:

 Mandritsaria ambositrensis Descarpentries, 1968
 Mandritsaria antamponensis Descarpentries, 1968
 Mandritsaria catalai Descarpentries, 1968
 Mandritsaria inaequalis (Gory & Laporte, 1839)
 Mandritsaria payrierasi Descarpentries, 1968
 Mandritsaria sicardi Descarpentries, 1968
 Mandritsaria vadoni Descarpentries, 1968

References

Buprestidae genera